Malcolm Campbell (9 January 1881 – 14 December 1967) was an Australian cricketer. He played in one first-class match for Queensland in 1899/1900.

See also
 List of Queensland first-class cricketers

References

External links
 

1881 births
1967 deaths
Australian cricketers
Queensland cricketers
Cricketers from Brisbane